Vanishing Point is the ninth studio album by the Seattle, Washington based band Mudhoney. It was released on April 2, 2013. This is their sixth studio album release on Sub Pop.

Critical reception

Vanishing Point received generally positive reviews from most music critics. At Metacritic, they assign a "weighted average" score out of 100 to reviews and ratings from mainstream critics, and the album received a Metascore of 76, based on 20 reviews. Allmusic's Stephen Thomas Erlewine affirmed that this is "a Mudhoney album through and through", which contains "no outright surprises sonically, but beneath the roar it's hard not to admire how their perennial piss-takes are subtly deepening and how their saturated superfuzz always sounds so good." At Blurt, Mike Shanley evoked that "Mudhoney shows no sign of either calming down or tinkering with a good formula." Marc Burrows of Drowned in Sound alluded to how that "while it's very much business as usual [...] groove-led-Stooges-acid-pop with added screaming [...] it sounds so gloriously Mudhoney it offers a thrill akin to Popping Candy fizzing in My Little Pony blood."

Martyn Young of musicOMH proclaimed that the release "is such a vibrant and quintessential Mudhoney album makes it a real triumph." At Mojo, Stevie Chick called it the "best of the bunch". NME'''s Thom Gibbs claimed that the band was "putting the fun in grunge since 1988, Mudhoney drink from the familiar well of Iggy on their ninth album with outrageously enjoyable results." Andrew Perry of Q found that the band are "pissed off, over-amped, just the right side of sloppy, shorn of the brass grafted into recent outings", which is "exactly like themselves." At Uncut, Peter Watts told that the release "is a riot of dirty [...] yet never cluttered" that contains "Detroit riffs and Mark Arm's laconically enrage vocals."

However, Matt Melis of Consequence of Sound stated that Mudhoney is "maturing without growing up," but this only "works here on a handful of tracks", which is because the album is "cleaning up the band’s early fuzz without sacrificing their trademark youthful irreverence." At Under the Radar, Dan Lucas noted how "Vanishing Point is a reflection of the band's current creative mindset", and told that "what little credit can be afforded Vanishing Point'' is due to the album's lack of pretention", which is not very much because the listener needs only to "think Ash covering Nirvana and you'll have an idea of just how bad an idea this album is."

Track listing
All tracks written by Mark Arm, Steve Turner, Dan Peters, and Guy Maddison.

Personnel

Mark Arm (Vocals/Guitar) (Guitar On track 1, track 2, track 6,) (slide guitar on track 10)
Steve Turner (Guitar) (Backing vocals on track 1, track 2, track 7)
Dan Peters (Drums) (Guitar on track 2, Tambourine On track 3, track 7, track 8, glockenspiel on track 2)
Guy Maddison (Bass) (Backing vocals on track 2) 
Johnny Sangster (Piano on track 2)
Ty Bailie (Organ on track 2, track 9, clavinet on track 3)
Backing Vocals on track 2: Sam Peters, Will Peters, Emily Rieman, Lacey Swain, Emily Nokes, Leiah Maupin, Johnny Sangster
Ivan Schwartz (Synthesizers on track 5, track 6, theremin on track 5)
Backing vocals On Track 7: Emily Rieman, Lacey Swain, Emily Nokes, Leiah Maupin
Emily Rieman (Photography)
Jeff Kleinsmith (Art direction)

Charts

References

External links
 Vanishing Point on Subpop.com
 Vanishing Point Trailer on Youtube
 Mudhoney official website

Mudhoney albums
2013 albums
Sub Pop albums